Pingree Road is one of two commuter railroad stations on Metra's Union Pacific Northwest Line in the city of Crystal Lake, Illinois.

As of April 25, 2022, Pingree Road is served by 53 trains (26 inbound, 27 outbound) on weekdays, by 30 trains (15 in each direction) on Saturdays, and by 20 trains (nine inbound, all 11 outbound) on Sundays.

Pingree Road Station is the  station to be constructed on the UP-NW Line, opening on September 7, 2005. It serves as the southern terminus of the McHenry Branch of the UP-NW line. West of the station, the Main Branch becomes the Harvard Branch. Currently, no bus connections are available at this station.

References

External links
Metra - Pingree Road
Flickr - Pingree Road Station

Pingree Road
Railway stations in the United States opened in 2005
Crystal Lake, Illinois
Railway stations in McHenry County, Illinois